North Dakota Quarterly (NDQ) is a literary journal published quarterly by the University of North Dakota. NDQ publishes poetry, fiction, interviews, and literary non-fiction. It was first published in 1911 as a vehicle for faculty papers. After a hiatus during the depression, NDQ began publishing again with a broader focus that gradually came to include stories and poems. Preeminent Hemingway scholar Robert W. Lewis edited NDQ from 1982 until his death in 2013 and published about a dozen special editions focused on Hemingway, as well as a number of special editions focused on China, Yugoslavia, and Native American issues and literature. In 2019, NDQ began being published by the University of Nebraska Press.

Contributors
 Louise Erdrich, poet, novelist, short story writer, winner of the National Book Award for Fiction for The Round House in 2012.
 Kathleen Norris, author of Dakota: A Spiritual Geography and a number of other non-fiction books.
 Ted Kooser, former U.S. Poet Laureate
 N. Scott Momaday, Pulitzer Prize winner 
 Jacob M. Appel, short story writer
 Larry Woiwode, North Dakota Poet Laureate, novelist and short story writer
 Jimmy Carter, former United States President, published original poetry in 1992
 Thomas McGrath, celebrated American poet from North Dakota
James Sallis, novelist, poet, and short story writer.

Honors and awards
 Pushcart Prize in 2008 "Overwintering in Fairbanks," an essay by Erica Keiko Iseri that first appeared in NDQ  
 O. Henry Award in 1993 for The Killing Blanket by Rilla Askew
 The Council of Editors of Learned Journals (CELJ), runner up in 1993 for best special issue, Out of Yugoslavia

See also 
List of literary magazines

References

External links
 North Dakota Quarterly website

Literary magazines published in the United States
Quarterly magazines published in the United States
Magazines established in 1911
Magazines published in North Dakota
University of North Dakota